Export Cola was an Australian carbonated cola drink Manufactured by Cadbury Schweppes (now Cadbury plc) during the 1970s and early 1980s. A series of TV advertisements for the drink featured the Australian cricketer Jeff Thomson. It enjoyed a brief resurgence in popularity when it was re-launched in 1993, but the drink was discontinued in 1999.

Cadbury-Schweppes brands